Jonathan Laws (born 1 September 1964) is an English former professional footballer who played in the Football League for Mansfield Town.

References

1964 births
Living people
English footballers
Association football midfielders
English Football League players
Wolverhampton Wanderers F.C. players
Mansfield Town F.C. players
Willenhall Town F.C. players
Gresley F.C. players
Nuneaton Borough F.C. players
Leek Town F.C. players